Laurent Constantin (born 10 June 1988) is a French badminton player in men's and mixed doubles event. In 2010, he won Finnish Open tournament. In 2012, he won Estonian International, Banuinvest International, and Miami International tournaments. In 2013, he won Estonian International, and became the runner-up at Tahiti International and Puerto Rico International. in 2014, he became the champion in French National Badminton Championships, and won the Brazil and Guatemala International tournament, then in 2015, he won Estonian International tournament.

Achievements

BWF International Challenge/Series 
Men's doubles

Mixed doubles

  BWF International Challenge tournament
  BWF International Series tournament
  BWF Future Series tournament

References

External links 
 

1988 births
Living people
French male badminton players